Supa Modo is a 2018 internationally co-produced drama film directed by Likarion Wainaina. It first premiered at 68th Berlin International Film Festival. It was selected as the Kenyan entry for the Best Foreign Language Film at the 91st Academy Awards, but it was not nominated.

Plot

Jo is a young girl living in a small village in Kenya. It's her dream to become a super-hero, but unfortunately these ambitions are hindered by her impending terminal illness. As an attempt to make her desires possible the whole village is plotting a genius plan with the goal to make her wish come true.

Background 
Supa Modo was produced as part of the One Fine Day Films workshop-project, which gives African filmmakers the opportunity to learn from mentors and create their stories for an international audience. The project was founded by Tom Tykwer and Marie Steinmann. Other movies resulting from said workshops include Kati Kati, Nairobi Half Life, Something Necessary and Soul Boy.

Festivals 
The movie had its world premiere at the 68th Berlin International Film Festival in the category "Generations".

Cast
 Stycie Waweru as Jo
 Akinyi Marianne Nungo as Kathryn
 Nyawara Ndambia as Mwix
 Johnson Gitau Chege as Mike 
 Humphrey Maina as Pato 
 Joseph Omari as Chairman 
 Rita Njenga as Nyanya 
 Dinah Githinji as Anne 
 Nellex Nderitu as Titus 
 Edna Daisy Nguka as Josephine
 Peris Wambui as Caro
 Mercy Kariuki as Soni 
 Cindy Kahura as Halima 
 Nick Mwathi as Villager 1
 Muriithi Mwangi Villager 2
 Martin Nyakabete as Villager 3
 Joseph Wairimu as Rico 
 Isaya Evans as Hospital Orderly 
 Manuel Sierbert as Doctor 
 Michael Bahati as Njuguna 
 Meshack Omondi as Bryo 
 Elsie Wairimy as Charlo 
 John Gathinya as Ozil 
 Francis Githinji as Toni 
 Jubilant Elijah as Kush 
 Euphine Akoth Odhiambo as Football Player 
 Mary Njeri Mwangi as Football Player 
 Benedict Musau as Football Player
 Yu Long Hu as King Fu Fighter 
 Biqun Su as Kung Fu Fighter 
 Likarion Wainaina as Motorcycle Mounted Thief

See also
 List of submissions to the 91st Academy Awards for Best Foreign Language Film
 List of Kenyan submissions for the Academy Award for Best Foreign Language Film

References

External links
 

2018 films
2018 drama films
Swahili-language films
German drama films
Kenyan drama films
2010s German films